is an action role-playing game developed by Climax Entertainment and published by Taito for the Super Famicom in 1995. It is a spinoff of Landstalker and was designed with female gamers in mind. Challenge from the Past is the only game related to Landstalker that was never released outside Japan, though the main character appeared in the Dreamcast title Time Stalkers.

A game entitled Lady Stalker was released for mobile phones in Japan only in 2006. It is not a remake of the original Lady Stalker, but an entirely new game, not in the same genre.

Gameplay
While Lady Stalker shares the same isometric viewpoint with Landstalker, gameplay is remarkably different. Unlike Landstalker the player character cannot jump, abandoning the most prominent aspect of its predecessor compared to other games of the genre. Another important difference is the way combat initiates. Whereas in Landstalker the enemies are visible at all times and freely move around the map, in Lady Stalker the battles are randomly triggered and cannot be avoided until all enemies are defeated, shifting the gameplay focus more from its action-adventure-roots to an RPG style. Later in the game, Yoshio and Cox will assist the protagonist Lady in her quest, and both can be used and commanded in battle.

Plot
The Lady Stalker storyline begins with Lady, a mischievous young girl who tends to disobey authority and travel around the world as an adventurer, despite the fact that she comes from a rich, upper-class family. She is constantly chased by her servants, the old gardener Yoshio and chef Cox. Lady's adventure involves her finding Deathland Island, a place that hides a treasure.

Development
Many of the employees of Climax Entertainment had formerly worked for Enix.  An initial pitch for the game was to create a spinoff of the 1990 Famicom game Dragon Quest IV that featured Princess Alena and her two companions.  After this proposal was rejected, the game was made into its own intellectual property instead, and became Lady Stalker.

Reception
On release, Famitsu scored the game a 28 out of 40, giving it a 7 out of 10 in their Reader Cross Review.

References

External links
Official website
Lady Stalker at MobyGames

1995 video games
Action role-playing video games
Japan-exclusive video games
Fantasy video games
Single-player video games
Super Nintendo Entertainment System games
Super Nintendo Entertainment System-only games
Video games developed in Japan
Video games featuring female protagonists
Video games with isometric graphics